Jeffrey "Jeff" Buttle (born September 1, 1982) is a Canadian figure skater and choreographer. He is the 2006 Winter Olympics bronze medalist, the 2008 World champion, the 2002 and 2004 Four Continents champion and the 2005–2007 Canadian champion. On March 22, 2008, Buttle became the first Canadian man since Elvis Stojko in 1997 to win the World Title. He announced his retirement from competitive skating on September 10, 2008.

Personal life
Buttle was born in Smooth Rock Falls, Ontario, and raised in Sudbury. During his career, he lived in Barrie, Ontario.

He attended École Don Bosco, a French-language elementary school. While Buttle's family is not French-Canadian, Buttle attended French-language schools as a child and is bilingual in English and French. He studied chemical engineering at the University of Toronto part-time before taking time off to focus on his skating.

In 2012, Buttle played ice hockey for a team in the Toronto Gay Hockey Association.

Buttle is openly gay and married Justin Harris in February 2014. They divorced in early 2021.

Career
Buttle began skating at age two and competing at age six. He did competitive ballet to improve his skating. Buttle also competed in ice dancing with his elder sister, Meghan. He trained at the Mariposa School of Skating in Barrie, Ontario.

Early career
Buttle won the silver medal in the junior level at the Canadian Championships in 1998. The next year, he placed in the top ten at his first senior nationals. He rose steadily through the ranks, gaining experience on the junior level. He made his senior international debut in the 2001–2002 season, making his mark immediately by winning the silver medal at the 2001 NHK Trophy behind Takeshi Honda. At the Canadian Championships, Buttle made his first run on the podium and placed third. It earned him a trip to Korea for the Four Continents, where he won his first gold medal.

Buttle's bronze medal finish at Nationals was not enough for him to be qualified as an alternate to the Canadian 2002 Olympic figure skating team. He hadn't met Canadian Olympic Association criteria. Silver medalist Emanuel Sandhu withdrew from the competition while Buttle could not replace him. Instead, Buttle went to the 2002 Worlds and placed high enough to earn Canada two spots to the next World Championships.

The next season, Buttle repeated his podium finish at Nationals, but was unable to defend his title at Four Continents. He worked to turn things around in the 2003–2004 season. He won his first Grand Prix gold medal at 2003 NHK Trophy, followed by his second silver, at 2003 Skate Canada. Buttle qualified for the Grand Prix Final, but was forced to withdraw. After that setback, he had a disappointing Nationals and did not earn a spot to Worlds. Buttle was instead sent to the Four Continents, which he won for the second time. Buttle spent that summer training in Lake Arrowhead with Rafael Arutyunyan, who would remain as his secondary coach with Lee Barkell. He recovered in the 2004–2005 season. He qualified for the Grand Prix Final a second time and won the silver medal. He went on to win his first National title. He finished the year with a silver medal at the 2005 Worlds.

Senior success

In the 2005–2006 Olympics season, Buttle won the 2005 Trophée Eric Bompard and came in second at the 2005 Skate Canada. He had a wardrobe malfunction at Skate Canada when his pants split during his performance. With a gold and a silver medal, he qualified for the 2005–2006 Grand Prix Final and captured his second consecutive silver medal at that competition. He went on to win his second National title at the 2006 Canadian Championships and went into the Olympics as the reigning World silver medalist. While not a favorite to win, he was a favorite to medal.

At the Olympics, Buttle's short program left him in sixth place going into the free skate. Two days later, during the free skate, Buttle fell on his attempt at a quad toe jump and then put a hand down on the ice after a triple Axel jump, where he ended up losing to Evgeni Plushenko from Russia. In the free skate, he scored a personal best and place second in the segment, third overall, winning Canada's first bronze medal in men's figure skating since Toller Cranston in 1976. Buttle later said that he kept thinking of winning a medal in his short program but later focused on simply enjoying himself in the free skate program, and it paid off. Later, he mentioned taking a day off between the short program and the free skating helped him.

After the Olympics, Buttle went on to the 2006 Worlds, held in Calgary. He placed sixth.

Buttle withdrew from the 2006 Grand Prix series due to a stress fracture in his back. He began his season at the 2007 Canadian Championships, where he won his third consecutive national title. After Nationals, Buttle went on to the 2007 Four Continents in Colorado. He was the leader after the short program, and became the first male under the Code of Points system to gain level fours on all spins and footwork. A free skate in which he only did a double Axel jump without combination and a single on the second attempt left him with the silver medal, behind American Evan Lysacek.

Buttle then competed at the 2007 Worlds. In his second international competition of the season, Buttle was second after the short program with a new personal best. He placed eighth in the free skate, dropping down to sixth place overall. His placement, combined with that of Christopher Mabee, earned Canada two spots to the 2008 World Championships.

For the 2007–2008 season, Buttle started off slow, placing third and fourth at his two Grand Prix events. He decided to change his short program back to the one used during the previous season. At the 2008 Canadian Championships, despite taking the lead after the short program, he ended up losing his title to a rising star Patrick Chan. At the 2008 Four Continents, after a third-place finish in the short program, Buttle went on to place second in the long and consequently won the silver medal.

At the 2008 Worlds, Buttle placed first in the short program. He then went on to deliver a personal best performance to win the gold medal by a 13.95 point margin over the defending world champion, France's Brian Joubert. Following his win at Worlds, Buttle appeared as a guest on many TV shows including CBC's Air Farce Live.

Assigned to the 2008 Skate Canada and 2008 Cup of China for the 2008–2009 season, Buttle prepared a new short program to "M.A.Y. in the Backyard" (Ryuichi Sakamoto) and a new free program to "Eclogue" (Gerald Finzi). However, he announced his retirement from competitive skating on September 10, 2008, saying that he had achieved his goals in skating, and competing was no longer in his heart. He represented the Sudbury Skating Club throughout his career.

Skate Canada published a Jeffrey Buttle Tribute Book on December 15, 2008. A second book about Buttle, Jeffrey Buttle Artist Book chapter TWO, was published in 2009 in Japan. Buttle served as the athlete representative on the Skate Canada Officials Advisory Committee.

Buttle acted as the Athlete Ambassador for the 2010 and 2011 Canadian Nationals. On November 15, 2012, Skate Canada announced he would be inducted into Skate Canada Hall of Fame in the athletic category. The induction ceremony was held during the 2016 Canadian Figure Skating Championships, where he performed a gala program, "Both Sides, Now".

Post-competitive career
Buttle has toured with Canadian Stars on Ice since his eligible days, and continues to skate in shows as a professional skater. He appeared in the 2009 US "Smuckers Stars on Ice" tour and has skated in several shows in China, Japan, Korea, and Europe. He has kept his technical level of skating by participating in pro-am competitions in Japan for many years.

In addition to his skating, Buttle works as a choreographer, another career path he started pursuing seriously after his retirement from amateur competition. He became interested in choreography after having watched David Wilson creating skating programs. Wilson has been the main choreographer of Buttle since 1999, and Buttle appreciated Wilson's passion for choreography. Buttle currently stays at Toronto Cricket, Skating and Curling Club as a choreographer. His past and current clients include:

 Max Aaron (Assassin's Tango/Oblivion)
 Jeremy Abbott
 Fedor Andreev
 Ryan Bradley
 Michal Březina
 Patrick Chan (2012–2014 short program)
 Alaine Chartrand
 Meryl Davis & Charlie White
 Meagan Duhamel & Eric Radford
 Joshua Farris
 Javier Fernández
 Artur Gachinski
 Yuzuru Hanyu (2012–2020 short programs)
 Wakaba Higuchi
 Marin Honda
 Rika Kihira
 Yuna Kim
 Kiira Korpi
 Kwak Min-jeong
 Amélie Lacoste
 Sonia Lafuente
 Lee June-hyoung
 Lim Eun-soo
 Satoko Miyahara
 Brandon Mroz (Mack the Knife)
 Takahito Mura
 Daisuke Murakami
 Mirai Nagasu
 Nam Nguyen
 Nobunari Oda
 Kaetlyn Osmond
 Paul Bonifacio Parkinson
 Alexandra Paul & Mitchell Islam
 Joseph Phan
 Ivan Righini
 Adam Rippon
 Joannie Rochette
 Netta Schreiber
 Song Nan (2012–2013 short and long programs)
 Shawn Sawyer
 Maia Shibutani & Alex Shibutani
 Tommy Steenberg
 Akiko Suzuki
 Daisuke Takahashi
 Jeremy Ten (A Single Man)
 Elizaveta Tuktamysheva
 Tessa Virtue & Scott Moir
 Sergei Voronov
 Ashley Wagner
 Angela Wang
 Lauren Wilson
 Yun Yea-ji
 Vincent Zhou

Also, he has choreographed ensemble numbers for Stars on Ice, Holiday Festival on Ice, The ICE, and Fantasy on Ice. He worked as part of the choreography team on the Canadian TV competition show Battle of the Blades, and was one of the choreographers for Intimissimi on Ice – OPERAPOP 2014.

Buttle became the director of Stars on Ice for the 2017 tour, in addition to his roles as a choreographer and a performer.

Programs

Post-2016

2009–2016

Pre-2009

Competitive highlights

Trivia
The designer Jef Billings created the costumes Buttle wore during the 2006 Olympic Games, where he won the bronze medal.

Roman Sadovsky has named Buttle as his idol and the most important inspiration in his skating career; as a boy, Sadovsky wanted to emulate Buttle's skating style.

References

External links

Gay sportsmen
LGBT figure skaters
1982 births
Living people
Canadian male single skaters
Figure skaters at the 2006 Winter Olympics
Olympic bronze medalists for Canada
Olympic figure skaters of Canada
People from Cochrane District
Skating people from Ontario
University of Toronto alumni
Olympic medalists in figure skating
World Figure Skating Championships medalists
Four Continents Figure Skating Championships medalists
Canadian LGBT sportspeople
Sportspeople from Greater Sudbury
Medalists at the 2006 Winter Olympics
Season-end world number one figure skaters
Fantasy on Ice main cast members
Figure skating choreographers
Canadian gay men